The 2011–12 Atlanta Hawks season was the 63rd season of the franchise in the National Basketball Association (NBA), and the 44th in Atlanta. The Hawks finished the lockout-shortened season in 5th place in the Eastern Conference with a 40–26 record and reached the 2012 NBA Playoffs where they lost in the first round against the Boston Celtics in six games.

Key dates
 June 23: The 2011 NBA draft will take place at Prudential Center in Newark, New Jersey.
 December 27: The Hawks begin the regular season with a victory against the New Jersey Nets.
 April 16: Atlanta secures a playoff spot with a 109–87 win against the Toronto Raptors.

Draft picks

Roster

Pre-season
Due to the 2011 NBA lockout negotiations, the programmed pre-season schedule, along with the first two weeks of the regular season were scrapped, and a two-game pre-season was set for each team once the lockout concluded.

|- bgcolor="ffcccc"
| 1
| December 19
| @ Charlotte Bobcats
| 77–79
| Josh SmithAl Horford (11)
| Josh SmithIvan Johnson (7)
| Joe Johnson (5)
| Time Warner Cable Arena
| 0–1
|- bgcolor="ccffcc"
| 2
| December 22
| Charlotte Bobcats
| 92–75
| Josh Smith (21)
| Zaza Pachulia (8)
| Joe Johnson (5)
| Philips Arena
| 1–1

Regular season

Standings

Record vs. opponents

Game log

|- bgcolor=#ccffcc
| 1
| December 27
| @ New Jersey
| 
| Vladimir Radmanović (17)
| Zaza Pachulia (11)
| Vladimir Radmanović (5)
| Prudential Center18,711
| 1–0
|- bgcolor=#ccffcc
| 2
| December 28
| Washington
| 
| Joe Johnson (18)
| Al HorfordJosh Smith(10)
| Jeff Teague (5)
| Philips Arena17,750
| 2–0
|- bgcolor=#ccffcc
| 3
| December 30
| New Jersey
| 
| Jeff Teague (22)
| Zaza Pachulia (8)
| Jeff Teague (6)
| Philips Arena16,300
| 3–0
|- bgcolor=#ffcccc
| 4
| December 31
| @ Houston
| 
| Al HorfordJoe Johnson (15)
| Josh Smith (7)
| Jeff Teague (5)
| Toyota Center14,390
| 3–1

|- bgcolor=#ccffcc
| 5
| January 2
| @ Miami
| 
| Joe Johnson (21)
| Al Horford (9)
| Jeff Teague (5)
| American Airlines Arena20,078
| 4–1
|- bgcolor=#ffcccc
| 6
| January 3
| @ Chicago
| 
| Al Horford (16)
| Josh Smith (14)
| Joe JohnsonJeff Teague (4)
| United Center22,166
| 4–2
|- bgcolor=#ffcccc
| 7
| January 5
| Miami
| 
| Joe Johnson (20)
| Josh Smith (13)
| Jeff Teague (7)
| Philips Arena18,371
| 4–3
|- bgcolor=#ccffcc
| 8
| January 6
| @ Charlotte
| 
| Josh Smith (23)
| Josh Smith (13)
| Jeff Teague (9)
| Time Warner Cable Arena17,827
| 5–3
|- bgcolor=#ccffcc
| 9
| January 7
| Chicago
| 
| Josh Smith (25)
| Al Horford (7)
| Jeff Teague (8)
| Philips Arena17,112
| 6–3
|- bgcolor=#ccffcc
| 10
| January 9
| @ New Jersey
| 
| Josh Smith (26)
| Al Horford (9)
| Al HorfordJoe Johnson (6)
| Prudential Center12,259
| 7–3
|- bgcolor=#ffcccc
| 11
| January 11
| @ Indiana
| 
| Josh Smith (16)
| Josh SmithZaza Pachulia (7)
| Three players (3)
| Bankers Life Fieldhouse10,334
| 7–4
|- bgcolor=#ccffcc
| 12
| January 12
| Charlotte
| 
| Josh Smith (30)
| Josh Smith (13)
| Joe Johnson (8)
| Philips Arena10,597
| 8–4
|- bgcolor=#ccffcc
| 13
| January 14
| Minnesota
| 
| Joe Johnson (25)
| Ivan Johnson (11)
| Jeff Teague (10)
| Philips Arena13,135
| 9–4
|- bgcolor=#ccffcc
| 14
| January 16
| Toronto
| 
| Josh Smith (28)
| Josh Smith (15)
| Joe JohnsonJeff Teague (6)
| Philips Arena11,050
| 10–4
|- bgcolor=#ccffcc
| 15
| January 18
| Portland
| 
| Joe Johnson (24)
| Josh SmithZaza Pachulia (11)
| Joe JohnsonJeff Teague (5)
| Philips Arena13,729
| 11–4
|- bgcolor=#ffcccc
| 16
| January 20
| @ Philadelphia
| 
| Willie Green (14)
| Josh Smith (6)
| Jeff Teague (6)
| Wells Fargo Center17,724
| 11–5
|- bgcolor=#ccffcc
| 17
| January 21
| Cleveland
| 
| Joe Johnson (25)
| Josh Smith (11)
| Jannero Pargo (6)
| Philips Arena15,922
| 12–5
|- bgcolor=#ccffcc
| 18
| January 23
| @ Milwaukee
| 
| Joe Johnson (26)
| Zaza Pachulia (14)
| Jeff TeagueTracy McGrady (5)
| Bradley Center13,048
| 13–5
|- bgcolor=#ffcccc
| 19
| January 25
| @ San Antonio
| 
| Jeff Teague (20)
| Marvin Williams (9)
| Joe Johnson (7)
| AT&T Center17,888
| 13–6
|- bgcolor=#ccffcc
| 20
| January 27
| @ Detroit
| 
| Joe Johnson (30)
| Josh Smith (11)
| Kirk Hinrich (9)
| The Palace of Auburn Hills14,010
| 14–6
|- bgcolor=#ccffcc
| 21
| January 29
| @ New Orleans
| 
| Jeff Teague (24)
| Joe Johnson (9)
| Jeff Teague (4)
| New Orleans Arena14,962
| 15–6
|- bgcolor=#ccffcc
| 22
| January 31
| @ Toronto
| 
| Joe Johnson (30)
| Josh SmithZaza PachuliaIvan Johnson (6)
| Jeff Teague (5)
| Air Canada Centre16,117
| 16–6

|- bgcolor=#ffcccc
| 23
| February 2
| Memphis
| 
| Josh Smith (11)
| Ivan Johnson (9)
| Tracy McGradyJeff TeagueJannero Pargo (4)
| Philips Arena14,211
| 16–7
|- bgcolor=#ffcccc
| 24
| February 4
| Philadelphia
| 
| Jeff Teague (21)
| Ivan Johnson (13)
| Jeff Teague (6)
| Philips Arena18,012
| 16–8
|- bgcolor=#ffcccc
| 25
| February 6
| Phoenix
| 
| Josh Smith (18)
| Zaza Pachulia (8)
| Three players (3)
| Philips Arena11,823
| 16–9
|- bgcolor=#ccffcc
| 26
| February 8
| Indiana
| 
| Josh Smith (28)
| Josh Smith (12)
| Joe Johnson (8)
| Philips Arena16,288
| 17–9
|- bgcolor=#ccffcc
| 27
| February 10
| @ Orlando
| 
| Josh Smith (23)
| Josh Smith (19)
| Joe JohnsonJosh Smith (5)
| Amway Center18,846
| 18–9
|- bgcolor=#ffcccc
| 28
| February 12
| Miami
| 
| Willie Green (17)
| Zaza Pachulia (16)
| Josh Smith (7)
| Philips Arena18,371
| 18–10
|- bgcolor=#ffcccc
| 29
| February 14
| @ L. A. Lakers
| 
| Jeff Teague (18)
| Zaza Pachulia (10)
| Joe Johnson (5)
| Staples Center18,997
| 18–11
|- bgcolor=#ccffcc
| 30
| February 15
| @ Phoenix
| 
| Josh Smith (30)
| Josh Smith (17)
| Josh Smith (7)
| US Airways Center15,392
| 19–11
|- bgcolor=#ffcccc
| 31
| February 18
| @ Portland
| 
| Joe Johnson (19)
| Zaza PachuliaJosh Smith (10)
| Josh Smith (9)
| Rose Garden20,635
| 19–12
|- bgcolor=#ffcccc
| 32
| February 20
| @ Chicago
| 
| Jannero Pargo (19)
| Josh Smith (12)
| Josh Smith (5)
| United Center22,033
| 19–13
|- bgcolor=#ffcccc
| 33
| February 22
| @ New York
| 
| Jeff Teague (18)
| Ivan Johnson (8)
| Willie Green (4)
| Madison Square Garden19,763
| 19–14
|- bgcolor=#ccffcc
| 34
| February 23
| Orlando
| 
| Josh Smith (22)
| Zaza Pachulia (13)
| Kirk HinrichZaza Pachulia (4)
| Philips Arena14,523
| 20–14
|- bgcolor=#ffcccc
| 35
| February 29
| Golden State
| 
| Joe Johnson (18)
| Zaza Pachulia (16)
| Jeff Teague (4)
| Philips Arena13,049
| 20–15

|- bgcolor=#ccffcc
| 36
| March 2
| Milwaukee
| 
| Josh Smith (24)
| Josh Smith (19)
| Tracy McGrady (5)
| Philips Arena13,311
| 21–15
|- bgcolor=#ccffcc
| 37
| March 3
| Oklahoma City
| 
| Josh Smith (30)
| Zaza Pachulia (14)
| Jerry Stackhouse (5)
| Philips Arena18,087
| 22–15
|- bgcolor=#ccffcc
| 38
| March 6
| @ Indiana
| 
| Josh Smith (27)
| Zaza Pachulia (10)
| Jeff Teague (9)
| Bankers Life Fieldhouse11,393
| 23–15
|- bgcolor=#ffcccc
| 39
| March 7
| @ Miami
| 
| Josh Smith (23)
| Zaza Pachulia (10)
| Zaza PachuliaJannero Pargo (3)
| American Airlines Arena20,018
| 23–16
|- bgcolor=#ffcccc
| 40
| March 9
| @ Detroit
| 
| Josh Smith (21)
| Josh Smith (7)
| Joe Johnson (4)
| The Palace of Auburn Hills15,503
| 23–17
|- bgcolor=#ccffcc
| 41
| March 11
| @ Sacramento
| 
| Josh Smith (28)
| Zaza Pachulia (13)
| Jeff Teague (7)
| Power Balance Pavilion13,976
| 24–17
|- bgcolor=#ffcccc
| 42
| March 13
| @ Denver
| 
| Joe Johnson (34)
| Zaza PachuliaJosh Smith (13)
| Jeff Teague (8)
| Pepsi Center15,594
| 24–18
|- bgcolor=#ffcccc
| 43
| March 14
| @ L. A. Clippers
| 
| Joe Johnson (19)
| Zaza Pachulia (10)
| Joe JohnsonJeff Teague (5)
| Staples Center19,060
| 24–19
|- bgcolor=#ccffcc
| 44
| March 16
| Washington
| 
| Joe Johnson (34)
| Zaza Pachulia (10)
| Josh Smith (8)
| Philips Arena15,241
| 25–19
|- bgcolor=#ccffcc
| 45
| March 18
| @ Cleveland
| 
| Joe Johnson (28)
| Zaza Pachulia (12)
| Josh Smith (9)
| Quicken Loans Arena15,645
| 26–19
|- bgcolor=#ffcccc
| 46
| March 19
| Boston
| 
| Joe Johnson (25)
| Zaza Pachulia (13)
| Josh Smith (8)
| Philips Arena16,412
| 26–20
|- bgcolor=#ccffcc
| 47
| March 21
| Cleveland
| 
| Josh Smith (32)
| Josh Smith (17)
| Jeff Teague (7)
| Philips Arena12,331
| 27–20
|- bgcolor=#ccffcc
| 48
| March 23
| New Jersey
| 
| Josh Smith (30)
| Josh Smith (12)
| Jeff Teague (6)
| Philips Arena14,129
| 28–20
|- bgcolor=#ccffcc
| 49
| March 24
| @ Washington
| 
| Josh Smith (20)
| Josh Smith (9)
| Jeff Teague (9)
| Verizon Center18,588
| 29–20
|- bgcolor=#ccffcc
| 50
| March 25
| Utah
| 
| Joe Johnson (37)
| Zaza Pachulia (20)
| Jeff Teague (9)
| Philips Arena13,544
| 30–20
|- bgcolor=#ffcccc
| 51
| March 27
| @ Milwaukee
| 
| Josh Smith (30)
| Josh Smith (18)
| Joe Johnson (8)
| Bradley Center12,223
| 30–21
|- bgcolor=#ffcccc
| 52
| March 28
| Chicago
| 
| Josh Smith (19)
| Zaza Pachulia (10)
| Jeff Teague (8)
| Philips Arena16,290
| 30–22
|- bgcolor=#ccffcc
| 53
| March 30
| New York
| 
| Joe Johnson (28)
| Zaza Pachulia (12)
| Jeff Teague (7)
| Philips Arena18,389
| 31–22
|- bgcolor=#ffcccc
| 54
| March 31
| @ Philadelphia
| 
| Josh Smith (34)
| Josh Smith (9)
| Kirk Hinrich (6)
| Wells Fargo Center19,714
| 31–23

|- bgcolor=#ccffcc
| 55
| April 4
| Charlotte
| 
| Josh Smith (24)
| Zaza Pachulia (11)
| Jannero PargoJeff Teague (6)
| Philips Arena13,046
| 32–23
|- bgcolor=#ccffcc
| 56
| April 6
| Detroit
| 
| Jeff Teague (24)
| Josh Smith (12)
| Jeff Teague (11)
| Philips Arena15,143
| 33–23
|- bgcolor=#ccffcc
| 57
| April 7
| @ Charlotte
| 
| Joe Johnson (18)
| Zaza Pachulia (16)
| Jannero Pargo (9)
| Time Warner Cable Arena14,715
| 34–23
|- bgcolor=#ffcccc
| 58
| April 11
| @ Boston
| 
| Jeff Teague (21)
| Josh Smith (11)
| Jeff Teague (6)
| TD Garden18,624
| 34–24
|- bgcolor=#ccffcc
| 59
| April 13
| @ Orlando
| 
| Jannero Pargo (17)
| Josh Smith (8)
| Josh Smith (4)
| Amway Center18,846
| 35–24
|- bgcolor=#ffcccc
| 60
| April 15
| Toronto
| 
| Josh Smith (26)
| Josh Smith (8)
| Joe Johnson (5)
| Philips Arena13,845
| 35–25
|- bgcolor=#ccffcc
| 61
| April 16
| @ Toronto
| 
| Ivan Johnson (21)
| Josh Smith (9)
| Jeff Teague (10)
| Air Canada Centre15,992
| 36–25
|- bgcolor=#ccffcc
| 62
| April 18
| Detroit
| 
| Tracy McGrady (17)
| Ivan Johnson (10)
| Jannero Pargo (8)
| Philips Arena14,392
| 37–25
|- bgcolor=#ccffcc
| 63
| April 20
| Boston
| 
| Joe Johnson (30)
| Josh Smith (12)
| Joe Johnson (6)
| Philips Arena16,214
| 38–25
|- bgcolor=#ffcccc
| 64
| April 22
| New York
| 
| Marvin Williams (29)
| Marvin Williams (11)
| Jeff Teague (6)
| Philips Arena18,158
| 38–26
|- bgcolor=#ccffcc
| 65
| April 24
| L. A. Clippers
| 
| Joe Johnson (28)
| Josh Smith (10)
| Josh Smith (5)
| Philips Arena18,223
| 39–26
|- bgcolor=#ccffcc
| 66
| April 26
| Dallas
| 
| Josh Smith (23)
| Josh Smith (9)
| Josh Smith (7)
| Philips Arena14,595
| 40–26

Playoffs

|- bgcolor=#ccffcc
| 1
| April 29
| Boston
| 
| Josh Smith (22)
| Josh Smith (18)
| Joe Johnson (5)
| Philips Arena19,292
| 1–0
|- bgcolor=#ffcccc
| 2
| May 1
| Boston
| 
| Joe Johnson (22)
| Josh Smith (12)
| Joe Johnson, Josh Smith (5)
| Philips Arena19,308
| 1–1
|- bgcolor=#ffcccc
| 3
| May 4
| @ Boston
| 
| Joe Johnson (29)
| Marvin Williams (11)
| Jeff Teague (6)
| TD Garden18,624
| 1–2
|- bgcolor=#ffcccc
| 4
| May 5
| @ Boston
| 
| Josh Smith (15)
| Josh Smith (13)
| Josh Smith (5)
| TD Garden18,624
| 1–3
|- bgcolor=#ccffcc
| 5
| May 8
| Boston
| 
| Al Horford (19)
| Josh Smith (16)
| Josh Smith (6)
| Philips Arena19,319
| 2–3
|- bgcolor=#ffcccc
| 6
| May 10
| @ Boston
| 
| Josh Smith (18)
| Al Horford, Josh Smith (9)
| Jeff Teague (6)
| TD Garden18,624
| 2–4

Player statistics

Regular season

|- align="center" bgcolor=""
| 
| 30 || 10 || 10.3 || .400 ||  || .467 || 1.6 || .3 || .1 || .1 || 1.3
|- align="center" bgcolor="#f0f0f0"
| 
| 15 || 0 || 5.5 || .125 ||  ||  || 1.7 || .3 || .1 || .3 || .1
|- align="center" bgcolor=""
| 
| 53 || 2 || 17.4 || .471 || .442 || .857 || 1.5 || .8 || .4 || .1 || 7.6
|- align="center" bgcolor="#f0f0f0"
| 
| 48 || 31 || 25.8 || .414 || .346 || .781 || 2.1 || 2.8 || .8 || .2 || 6.6
|- align="center" bgcolor=""
| 
| 11 || 11 || 31.6 ||style="background:#C41E3A;color:white;" |.553 || .000 || .733 || 7.0 || 2.2 || .9 || 1.3 || 12.4
|- align="center" bgcolor="#f0f0f0"
| 
| 56 || 0 || 16.7 || .513 || .333 || .720 || 4.0 || .6 || .8 || .3 || 6.4
|- align="center" bgcolor=""
| 
| 60 || 60 ||style="background:#C41E3A;color:white;" |35.5 || .454 || .388 || .849 || 3.7 || 3.9 || .8 || .2 ||style="background:#C41E3A;color:white;" |18.8
|- align="center" bgcolor="#f0f0f0"
| 
| 52 || 0 || 16.1 || .437 ||style="background:#C41E3A;color:white;" |.455 || .675 || 3.0 || 2.1 || .3 || .3 || 5.3
|- align="center" bgcolor=""
| 
| 58 || 44 || 28.3 || .499 ||  || .741 || 7.9 || 1.4 || .9 || .5 || 7.8
|- align="center" bgcolor="#f0f0f0"
| 
| 50 || 0 || 13.4 || .415 || .384 ||style="background:#C41E3A;color:white;" |.950 || 1.5 || 1.9 || .4 || .0 || 5.6
|- align="center" bgcolor=""
| 
| 49 || 3 || 15.4 || .376 || .370 || .759 || 2.9 || 1.1 || .4 || .3 || 4.5
|- align="center" bgcolor="#f0f0f0"
| 
| 5 || 0 || 4.0 || .375 || .000 ||  || 1.0 || 1.0 || .2 || .0 || 1.2
|- align="center" bgcolor=""
| 
|style="background:#C41E3A;color:white;" |66 ||style="background:#C41E3A;color:white;" |66 || 35.3 || .458 || .257 || .630 ||style="background:#C41E3A;color:white;" |9.6 || 3.9 || 1.4 ||style="background:#C41E3A;color:white;" |1.7 ||style="background:#C41E3A;color:white;" |18.8
|- align="center" bgcolor="#f0f0f0"
| 
| 30 || 0 || 9.1 || .370 || .342 || .913 || .8 || .5 || .3 || .1 || 3.6
|- align="center" bgcolor=""
| 
|style="background:#C41E3A;color:white;" |66 ||style="background:#C41E3A;color:white;" |66 || 33.1 || .476 || .342 || .757 || 2.4 ||style="background:#C41E3A;color:white;" |4.9 ||style="background:#C41E3A;color:white;" |1.6 || .6 || 12.6
|- align="center" bgcolor="#f0f0f0"
| 
| 57 || 37 || 26.3 || .432 || .389 || .788 || 5.2 || 1.2 || .8 || .3 || 10.2
|}
  Statistics with the Atlanta Hawks.

Playoffs

|- align="center" bgcolor=""
| 
| 5 || 4 || 17.0 || .545 ||  ||  || 2.4 || .0 || .2 || .0 || 2.4
|- align="center" bgcolor="#f0f0f0"
| 
| 4 || 0 || 13.8 || .538 ||  || .667 || 3.5 || .0 || .0 || .2 || 4.0
|- align="center" bgcolor=""
| 
| 5 || 0 || 12.6 || .462 || .250 ||  || 1.6 || .6 || .0 || .0 || 2.6
|- align="center" bgcolor="#f0f0f0"
| 
| 6 || 4 || 23.5 || .433 || .375 ||style="background:#C41E3A;color:white;" |1.000 || 2.0 || 1.0 || .7 || .0 || 5.7
|- align="center" bgcolor=""
| 
| 3 || 2 || 36.0 ||style="background:#C41E3A;color:white;" |.588 ||  || .750 || 8.3 || 2.7 || 1.3 ||style="background:#C41E3A;color:white;" |1.3 || 15.3
|- align="center" bgcolor="#f0f0f0"
| 
| 5 || 0 || 10.8 || .313 || .000 || .600 || 3.4 || .0 || .6 || .0 || 2.6
|- align="center" bgcolor=""
| 
| 6 || 4 ||style="background:#C41E3A;color:white;" |40.5 || .373 || .250 || .750 || 3.5 || 3.5 || 1.3 || .2 ||style="background:#C41E3A;color:white;" |17.2
|- align="center" bgcolor="#f0f0f0"
| 
| 6 || 0 || 15.0 || .385 || .000 || .833 || 2.8 || 1.0 || .0 || .3 || 4.2
|- align="center" bgcolor="#f0f0f0"
| 
| 5 || 0 || 9.2 || .286 || .333 ||  || 1.0 || 1.2 || .4 || .0 || 3.2
|- align="center" bgcolor=""
| 
| 2 || 0 || 7.5 || .000 || .000 ||  || .5 || .5 || .0 || .0 || .0
|- align="center" bgcolor=""
| 
| 5 || 4 || 39.2 || .386 || .000 || .762 ||style="background:#C41E3A;color:white;" |13.6 ||style="background:#C41E3A;color:white;" |4.8 || .6 || 1.0 || 16.8
|- align="center" bgcolor=""
| 
| 6 || 4 || 37.5 || .411 || .412 || .895 || 3.7 || 4.2 || .8 || .8 || 14.0
|- align="center" bgcolor="#f0f0f0"
| 
| 6 || 2 || 24.2 || .356 ||style="background:#C41E3A;color:white;" |.500 || .778 || 5.5 || .8 || .5 || .3 || 7.8
|}

Awards and milestones
 Joe Johnson was named Eastern Conference Player of the Week (March 19 – 25).
 Ivan Johnson was named Eastern Conference Rookie of the Month for April.

All-Star
 Joe Johnson was selected as a reserve for the East in the 2012 NBA All-Star Game and was scheduled to participate in the Three-Point Contest and Shooting Stars Competition but an injury didn't allow him to play. Rajon Rondo, Kevin Durant and teammate Jerry Stackhouse replaced him in each competition respectively.

Injuries and disciplinary actions
 Kirk Hinrich missed the first 18 games of the regular season after having surgery on his left shoulder.
 On January, Al Horford underwent surgery to repair a torn left pectoral muscle and missed the remainder of the regular season.
 Ivan Johnson was fined $25,000 for making an obscene gesture to a fan after their Game 6 loss to the Boston Celtics in the playoffs.
 Hawks co-owner Michael Gearon, Jr. received a $35,000 fine for comments made on Celtics forward Kevin Garnett and officials during the first round of the playoffs.

Transactions

Overview

Trades

Free agents

Many players signed with teams from other leagues due to the 2011 NBA lockout. FIBA allows players under NBA contracts to sign and play for teams from other leagues if the contracts have opt-out clauses that allow the players to return to the NBA if the lockout ends. The Chinese Basketball Association, however, only allows its clubs to sign foreign free agents who could play for at least the entire season.

See also
2011–12 NBA season

References

Atlanta Hawks seasons
Atlanta Hawks
Atlanta Haw
Atlanta Haw